Albert Meyer may refer to:

Albert Meyer (politician) (1870–1953), member of the Swiss Federal Council, 1929–1938
Albert Gregory Meyer (1903–1965), Archbishop of Chicago
Albert J. Meyer (economist) (1919–1983), American economist
Albert J. Meyer (accountant), forensic accountant and investor
Albert R. Meyer (born 1941), computer scientist
Albert Meyer (footballer), Swiss footballer

See also
Albert J. Myer (1828–1880), surgeon and US Army officer
Albert L. Myer (1846–1914), mayor of Ponce, Puerto Rico, 1899
USNS Albert J. Myer, a 1945 cable ship built for the U.S. Army named for Albert J. Myer, later Navy Neptune-class cable repair ship
Albert Meyers (1932–2007), American organic chemist